Stonewall Confederate Cemetery is a subsection of Mount Hebron Cemetery in Winchester, Virginia, established in 1866 for 2,575 Confederate soldiers who died in battle or in the hospitals in and around the Winchester area. A monument over the mass grave of more than 800 unknown Confederate soldiers is at the center of the cemetery, and there is a section for each state member of the Confederacy. The plots are thus organized according to the home states of the fallen soldiers within. There are state monuments in most of the sections.

Notable burials
 The Brothers Ashby:
 Brigadier General Turner Ashby (1828–1862), "Black Knight of the Confederacy", cavalry commander during Jackson's Valley Campaign, killed at Good's Farm
 Captain Richard Ashby (1831–1861), killed by Union patrol near Hampshire County
 The Patton Brothers:
 Colonel George Smith Patton (1833–1864), brigade commander during the Valley Campaigns of 1864, killed at Opequon; grandfather of General George S. Patton, army commander during World War II
 Colonel Waller Tazewell Patton (1835–1863), commander of the 7th Virginia Infantry, killed during Pickett's Charge at Gettysburg
 Brigadier General Archibald Campbell Godwin (1831–1864), brigade commander during the Valley Campaigns of 1864, killed at Opequon
 Brigadier General Robert Daniel Johnston (1837–1919), brigade commander  during the Overland Campaign and in the Valley Campaigns of 1864; father of Colonel Gordon Johnston, Medal of Honor recipient during Philippine–American War
 Major General John George Walker (1821–1893), Mexican–American War veteran, brigade commander during the Peninsula Campaign, commander of Walker's Greyhounds in the Western Theater

References

External links
 
 

1866 establishments in Virginia
Buildings and structures in Winchester, Virginia
Tourist attractions in Winchester, Virginia
Confederate States of America monuments and memorials in Virginia